The following is a list of the monastic houses in Hertfordshire, England.

See also
 List of monastic houses in England

Notes

References

Medieval sites in England
Hertfordshire
Hertfordshire
Monastic houses